Philip James Crampton, commonly known as Phil Crampton, is a British born mountaineer and expedition leader, and owner of the mountaineering company Altitude Junkies.

Mountaineering 

Crampton's climbing achievements include successful ascents of Everest (7 times), Cho Oyu (twice) and Manaslu (4 times). He has led more than 40 expeditions to 8,000m peaks.

Crampton was born in the United Kingdom, but moved to the United States in his early 20s. He took up climbing and became an instructor. Initially he guided in North America, but later he started guiding in the Himalayas. He was an expedition leader with the mountaineering operators SummitClimb and Mountain Madness before setting up his own company, Altitude Junkies, in 2002.

With Jon Otto he helped to set up the Tibet Mountaineering Guide School in Lhasa to train native Tibetans in the skills needed to guide mountaineering expeditions, and he taught there for many years.

Expedition resumé 

Crampton has led expeditions in North America, South America and Asia, including the following 8,000m peaks:
 Broad Peak (Pakistan)
 Cho Oyu (Tibet) (8 times)
 Dhaulagiri (Nepal)
 Everest (Nepal) (7 times)
 Everest (Tibet) (8 times)
 Gasherbrum I (Pakistan) (4 times)
 Gasherbrum II (Pakistan) (4 times)
 Lhotse, (Nepal) (2 times)
 Makalu, (Nepal)
 Manaslu, (Nepal) (8 times)
 Shishapangma (Tibet) (2 times).

Rescues on Everest 

Crampton was involved in the rescue of the Australian mountaineer Lincoln Hall, who was found alive high up on Everest's Northeast Ridge in 2006 after spending a night above . Hall had been left for dead and his death reported in the Australian press before he was found by members of the SummitClimb expedition team the following morning. Crampton's precise role in the incident remains unclear.

Personal life 

Crampton was born in Nottingham, England, and when not on expedition divides his time between Kathmandu and Woodstock, New York, both of which he calls home. He is married to an American, Trish Crampton. He is proud of his Nottingham heritage, and describes his heroes as the mountaineer Doug Scott, the fashion designer Paul Smith, and the former Nottingham Forest football manager Brian Clough, all of whom had roots there.

See also
List of Mount Everest summiters by number of times to the summit

References

British summiters of Mount Everest
English mountain climbers
Sportspeople from Nottingham
Living people
Year of birth missing (living people)